My Solo Project is the debut album by Mates of State.

Track listing
 "Names" - 0:51
 "Proofs" - 2:17
 "What I Could Stand For" - 3:22
 "La'hov" - 3:46
 "Nice Things That Look Good" - 4:27
 "A Control Group" - 3:00
 "Throw Down" - 2:32
 "I Have Space" - 2:26
 "Everyone Needs an Editor" - 2:54
 "Tan/Black" - 3:57
 "Ride Again" - 3:40
 "More in Me" - 0:39

References

 

2000 debut albums
Mates of State albums